Meryozha is a rural locality (a village) in Lentyevskoye Rural Settlement, Ustyuzhensky District, Vologda Oblast, Russia. The population was 131 as of 2002. There are 17 streets.

Geography 
Veshki is the nearest rural locality.

References 

Rural localities in Ustyuzhensky District